The Yanco to Griffith railway line is a railway line in New South Wales, Australia. Together with the Junee- Yanco section of the Hay railway line, it is one of two routes to the town of Griffith, the other route being via Temora. It branches from the Hay railway line at the town of Yanco and passes through the town of Leeton before reaching Griffith. The line is open to passenger trains – a weekly NSW TrainLink passenger service operates on weekends. A passenger station remains open at Leeton.

See also
Rail transport in New South Wales

Regional railway lines in New South Wales
Standard gauge railways in Australia